Lara Hedberg Deam (born 1967) is the founder of architecture and design magazine Dwell and  chair of the Dwell, LLC board.

Hedberg was raised in Janesville, Wisconsin, United States, and is the daughter of Don and Gerry Hedberg, founders of the company, Lab Safety Supply. After her family sold the company, Hedberg involved herself in philanthropy. When she moved to Mill Valley, California, in 1994, Hedberg's experience in renovating her house inspired her to found the magazine.

Hedberg is married to Christopher Deam, and has twins born in 2003.

External links
Biographical sketch from Apple Store and AIGA of San Francisco
Profile of Dwell from Apple Computer
Dwell: Who We Are

Notes

1967 births
Living people
American philanthropists
American magazine publishers (people)
People from Janesville, Wisconsin
Businesspeople from San Francisco
20th-century American businesspeople
20th-century American businesswomen
21st-century American women